Laemostenus terricola is a species of ground beetle native to Europe.

References

Laemostenus
Beetles described in 1784
Beetles of Europe